Oruvar Meethu Iruvar Sainthu is a 2013 Indian Tamil-language romantic drama film directed by Balasekaran of Love Today (1997) fame. Laguparan and Swathy, who previously collaborated in Raattinam (2012), star in the lead along with Sanyathara.

Cast 
 Laguparan as Ganesh
 Swathy as Savita 
 Sanyathara as Kavita
 K. Bhagyaraj 
 Visu as Judge
 Raj Kapoor as Savita's guardian
 Singampuli

Release 
A critic from The New Indian Express stated that "What’s catchy about the film is its title, apt for the story. If only the script was better crafted". A critic from The Times of India gave the film a rating of one out of five stars and stated that "The movie is far from promising and every song, comedy track and fight just gives us briefs intervals to step out of the hall". A critic from Maalai Malar praised the unique storyline, songs, and cinematography. Critics from Dinakaran and Dinamalar criticized the old story.

References

External links 

Indian romantic drama films
2013 romantic drama films
2013 films